Proto-oncogene serine/threonine-protein kinase mos is an enzyme that in humans is encoded by the MOS gene.

Interactions
MOS (gene) has been shown to interact with MyoD.

References

Further reading